The 1910–11 Columbia men's ice hockey season was the 15th season of play for the program.

Season
In order to bring the ice hockey club out of its two-year funk, Columbia engaged Ottawa Senators goaltender Percy LeSueur to coach the team. Hopes were high when practices began in December but when all players vying for the job in goal were ruled ineligible a frantic search for a replacement was made. Despite the trouble Columbia got off to a good start, winning both games on a season-opening road trip to Cleveland.

Columbia opened the IHA schedule with a loss against defending champion Princeton but were able to defeat Yale in their next game. The win over the Bulldogs was the first for the Lions over a conference opponent in almost three years. Columbia couldn't keep up the pace against the likes of Harvard but their close victory over Dartmouth was their first away from the St. Nicholas Rink in at least six years.

Columbia finished with a winning record for the first time since 1900 and though they weren't a match for the upper echelon of college hockey they were at least no longer being embarrassed.

Roster

Standings

Schedule and Results

|-
!colspan=12 style=";" | Regular Season

References

Columbia Lions men's ice hockey seasons
Columbia
Columbia
Columbia
Columbia